Branchiura is a genus of annelids belonging to the family Naididae.

The genus has cosmopolitan distribution.

Species:

Branchiura sowerbyi

References

Annelids